Nuku Hiva Airport is an airport on Nuku Hiva in the Marquesas Islands, French Polynesia. It is also known as Nuku A Taha ("Deserted Land"). The drive to Taiohae is over dirt roads and takes 90 minutes.

Plans for the airport were revealed in 1976. It was to be constructed in two stages, with the first phase consisting of a 1,500 meter runway, which would be expanded to 2,650 meters in phase two. Construction began in 1979. The second phase was never built.

Airlines and destinations

Passenger

Statistics

References

External links

Airports in French Polynesia
Nuku Hiva